Sun Meiying (1931 – 22 March 1993), also known as Sun Mei-ying, was a female Chinese former international table tennis player.

Table tennis career
She was a prolific medalist winning nine medals at the World Table Tennis Championships consisting of two silver medals and seven bronze medals.

Her doubles partners were Qiu Zhonghui (mixed) and Wang Chuanyao (women's).

See also
 List of table tennis players
 List of World Table Tennis Championships medalists

References

Chinese female table tennis players
1993 deaths
1931 births
Table tennis players from Shanghai
World Table Tennis Championships medalists